Zachary J. Hayes  (born September 21, 1932, Chicago, Illinois) is an American Franciscan theologian and Bonaventure scholar.

Biography 
Born in Chicago, Hayes completed a BA in Philosophy in 1956 from Quincy University and a ThD in 1964 from the University of Bonn, in Germany. In 1974, he was appointed Full Professor of Systematic theology at the Catholic Theological Union where he taught for 37 years.

He has published 16 books and 55 articles. A festschrift was prepared in his honor, entitled That Others May Know and Love (1997).

References

External links 
 Delio, I. (2007). Cosmic Christology in the Thought of Zachary Hayes. Franciscan Studies, 65, 107–120. http://www.jstor.org/stable/41975423

Living people
1999 births
Catholic Theological Union faculty
American theologians